Toccoa station, formerly known as the Toccoa Southern Railway Depot, is a train station in Toccoa, Georgia. It is currently served by Amtrak's Crescent. The street address is 47 North Alexander Street, in the heart of downtown Toccoa.

The original structure was built in 1915. In 2005, the city of Toccoa began the restoration of the wood-frame depot according to a design by Carter Watkins Architects, Inc., of Monroe, Georgia. The funding for the project came from several sources: $374,000 in ISTEA funds through the state DOT, which the city matched with $100,000, as well as $500,000 from the Stephens County Historical Society for interior work and for an addition to house the Currahee Military Museum. In October 2009, the new 4,400 square-foot space was dedicated during the popular Currahee Military Weekend. It contains a large meeting room, gift shop, research library, and office space. In addition to housing the Amtrak station, the restored depot is used today by the Toccoa-Stephens County Chamber of Commerce and Welcome Center as well as the Stephens County Historical Society.

References

External links 

Toccoa Southern Railway Depot (Georgia's Railway History & Heritage)
Toccoa Amtrak Station(USA RailGuide -- TrainWeb)

Transportation in Stephens County, Georgia
Amtrak stations in Georgia (U.S. state)
Stations along Southern Railway lines in the United States
Buildings and structures in Stephens County, Georgia
1915 establishments in Georgia (U.S. state)